Pat Childers (October 27, 1941 – December 26, 2020) was an American politician who served in the Wyoming House of Representatives from the 50th district from 1997 to 2013.

He died on December 26, 2020, in Cody, Wyoming, at age 79.

References

1941 births
2020 deaths
Republican Party members of the Wyoming House of Representatives